The 1991–92 Eastern Illinois Panthers men's basketball team represented the Eastern Illinois University during the 1991–92 NCAA Division I men's basketball season. Led by head coach Rick Samuels, they were the champions of the Mid-Continent Basketball tournament to earn the conference's automatic bid in the 1992 NCAA tournament. As the 15 seed in the West region, the Panthers fell to Indiana in the opening round, 94–55.

Roster

Schedule and results

|-
!colspan=9 style=| Regular season

|-
!colspan=9 style=|Mid-Continent Conference tournament

|-
!colspan=9 style=|NCAA tournament

References 

Eastern Illinois Panthers men's basketball seasons
Eastern Illinois Panthers men's basket
Eastern Illinois Panthers men's basket
Eastern Illinois
Eastern Illinois